Zapadores is an underground metro station on the Line 2 of the Santiago Metro, in Santiago, Chile. It is the last northern station of the Line 2 prior to reaching the Vespucio Norte terminus. The station was opened on 21 December 2006 as part of the extension of the line from Einstein to Vespucio Norte.

References

Santiago Metro stations
Railway stations opened in 2008
Santiago Metro Line 2